Wiru Rural LLG is a local-level government (LLG) of Southern Highlands Province, Papua New Guinea. The Wiru language is spoken in the LLG.

Wards
01. Poloko 2
02. Poloko 1
03. Borona
04. Koiyapu
05. Poleya
06. Iaro 1
07. Iaro 2
08. Kalane
09. Kaluwe 1
10. Kaluwe 2
11. Weriko
12. Maubinin
13. Kerapali
14. Tunda
15. Timbikene 1
16. Timbikene 2
17. Pubi
18. Lawe
19. Timbari 1
20. Timbari 2
21. Wanu
22. Marapini
23. Undiyapu
24. Yakiliyapu
25. Yoka
26. Kuabini
27. Noiya
28. Taguru
29. Mamuane
33. Powe
34. Kengerene

References

Local-level governments of Southern Highlands Province